In mathematics, the complex plane is the plane formed by the complex numbers, with a Cartesian coordinate system such that the -axis, called the real axis, is formed by the real numbers, and the -axis, called the imaginary axis, is formed by the imaginary numbers.

The complex plane allows a geometric interpretation of complex numbers. Under addition, they add like vectors. The multiplication of two complex numbers can be expressed more easily in polar coordinates—the magnitude or modulus of the product is the product of the two absolute values, or moduli, and the angle or argument of the product is the sum of the two angles, or arguments. In particular, multiplication by a complex number of modulus 1 acts as a rotation.

The complex plane is sometimes known as the Argand plane or Gauss plane.

Notational conventions

Complex numbers
In complex analysis, the complex numbers are customarily represented by the symbol z, which can be separated into its real (x) and imaginary (y) parts:

for example: z = 4 + 5i, where x and y are real numbers, and i is the imaginary unit. In this customary notation the complex number z corresponds to the point (x, y) in the Cartesian plane.

In the Cartesian plane the point (x, y) can also be represented in polar coordinates as

In the Cartesian plane it may be assumed that the arctangent takes values from −π/2 to π/2 (in radians), and some care must be taken to define the more complete arctangent function for points (x, y) when x ≤ 0. In the complex plane these polar coordinates take the form

where

Here |z| is the absolute value or modulus of the complex number z;  θ, the argument of z, is usually taken on the interval ; and the last equality (to |z|eiθ) is taken from Euler's formula. Without the constraint on the range of θ, the argument of z is multi-valued, because the complex exponential function is periodic, with period 2π i.

The theory of contour integration comprises a major part of complex analysis. In this context, the direction of travel around a closed curve is important – reversing the direction in which the curve is traversed multiplies the value of the integral by −1. By convention the positive direction is counterclockwise. For example, the unit circle is traversed in the positive direction when we start at the point z = 1, then travel up and to the left through the point z = i, then down and to the left through −1, then down and to the right through −i, and finally up and to the right to z = 1, where we started.

Almost all of complex analysis is concerned with complex functions – that is, with functions that map some subset of the complex plane into some other (possibly overlapping, or even identical) subset of the complex plane. Here it is customary to speak of the domain of f(z) as lying in the z-plane, while referring to the range of f(z) as a set of points in the w-plane. In symbols we write

and often think of the function f as a transformation from the z-plane (with coordinates (x, y)) into the w-plane (with coordinates (u, v)).

Complex plane notation

Argand diagram 

Argand diagram refers to a geometric plot of complex numbers as points  using the x-axis as the real axis and the y-axis as the imaginary axis. Such plots are named after Jean-Robert Argand (1768–1822), although they were first described by Norwegian–Danish land surveyor and mathematician Caspar Wessel (1745–1818). Argand diagrams are frequently used to plot the positions of the zeros and poles of a function in the complex plane.

Stereographic projections

It can be useful to think of the complex plane as if it occupied the surface of a sphere. Given a sphere of unit radius, place its center at the origin of the complex plane, oriented so that the equator on the sphere coincides with the unit circle in the plane, and the north pole is "above" the plane.

We can establish a one-to-one correspondence between the points on the surface of the sphere minus the north pole and the points in the complex plane as follows. Given a point in the plane, draw a straight line connecting it with the north pole on the sphere. That line will intersect the surface of the sphere in exactly one other point. The point  will be projected onto the south pole of the sphere. Since the interior of the unit circle lies inside the sphere, that entire region will be mapped onto the southern hemisphere. The unit circle itself will be mapped onto the equator, and the exterior of the unit circle will be mapped onto the northern hemisphere, minus the north pole. Clearly this procedure is reversible – given any point on the surface of the sphere that is not the north pole, we can draw a straight line connecting that point to the north pole and intersecting the flat plane in exactly one point.

Under this stereographic projection the north pole itself is not associated with any point in the complex plane. We perfect the one-to-one correspondence by adding one more point to the complex plane – the so-called point at infinity – and identifying it with the north pole on the sphere. This topological space, the complex plane plus the point at infinity, is known as the extended complex plane. We speak of a single "point at infinity" when discussing complex analysis. There are two points at infinity (positive, and negative) on the real number line, but there is only one point at infinity (the north pole) in the extended complex plane.

Imagine for a moment what will happen to the lines of latitude and longitude when they are projected from the sphere onto the flat plane. The lines of latitude are all parallel to the equator, so they will become perfect circles centered on the origin . And the lines of longitude will become straight lines passing through the origin (and also through the "point at infinity", since they pass through both the north and south poles on the sphere).

This is not the only possible yet plausible stereographic situation of the projection of a sphere onto a plane consisting of two or more values. For instance, the north pole of the sphere might be placed on top of the origin  in a plane that is tangent to the circle. The details don't really matter. Any stereographic projection of a sphere onto a plane will produce one "point at infinity", and it will map the lines of latitude and longitude on the sphere into circles and straight lines, respectively, in the plane.

Cutting the plane
When discussing functions of a complex variable it is often convenient to think of a cut in the complex plane. This idea arises naturally in several different contexts.

Multi-valued relationships and branch points
Consider the simple two-valued relationship

Before we can treat this relationship as a single-valued function, the range of the resulting value must be restricted  somehow. When dealing with the square roots of non-negative real numbers this is easily done. For instance, we can just define

to be the non-negative real number y such that . This idea doesn't work so well in the two-dimensional complex plane. To see why, let's think about the way the value of f(z) varies as the point z moves around the unit circle. We can write

Evidently, as z moves all the way around the circle, w only traces out one-half of the circle. So one continuous motion in the complex plane has transformed the positive square root e0 = 1 into the negative square root .

This problem arises because the point z = 0 has just one square root, while every other complex number z ≠ 0 has exactly two square roots. On the real number line we could circumvent this problem by erecting a "barrier" at the single point x = 0. A bigger barrier is needed in the complex plane, to prevent any closed contour from completely encircling the branch point z = 0. This is commonly done by introducing a branch cut; in this case the "cut" might extend from the point z = 0 along the positive real axis to the point at infinity, so that the argument of the variable z in the cut plane is restricted to the range 0 ≤ arg(z) < 2π.

To do so we need two copies of the z-plane, each of them cut along the real axis. On one copy we define the square root of 1 to be , and on the other we define the square root of 1 to be eiπ = −1. We call these two copies of the complete cut plane sheets. By making a continuity argument we see that the (now single-valued) function  maps the first sheet into the upper half of the w-plane, where , while mapping the second sheet into the lower half of the w-plane (where ).

The branch cut in this example doesn't have to lie along the real axis. It doesn't even have to be a straight line. Any continuous curve connecting the origin z = 0 with the point at infinity would work. In some cases the branch cut doesn't even have to pass through the point at infinity. For example, consider the relationship

Here the polynomial z2 − 1 vanishes when , so g evidently has two branch points. We can "cut" the plane along the real axis, from −1 to 1, and obtain a sheet on which g(z) is a single-valued function. Alternatively, the cut can run from z = 1 along the positive real axis through the point at infinity, then continue "up" the negative real axis to the other branch point, z = −1.

This situation is most easily visualized by using the stereographic projection described above. On the sphere one of these cuts runs longitudinally through the southern hemisphere, connecting a point on the equator (z = −1) with another point on the equator (z = 1), and passing through the south pole (the origin, z = 0) on the way. The second version of the cut runs longitudinally through the northern hemisphere and connects the same two equatorial points by passing through the north pole (that is, the point at infinity).

Restricting the domain of meromorphic functions
A meromorphic function is a complex function that is holomorphic and therefore analytic everywhere in its domain except at a finite, or countably infinite, number of points. The points at which such a function cannot be defined are called the poles of the meromorphic function. Sometimes all of these poles lie in a straight line. In that case mathematicians may say that the function is "holomorphic on the cut plane". Here's a simple example.

The gamma function, defined by

where γ is the Euler–Mascheroni constant, and has simple poles at 0, −1, −2, −3, ... because exactly one denominator in the infinite product vanishes when z is zero, or a negative integer. Since all its poles lie on the negative real axis, from z = 0 to the point at infinity, this function might be described as "holomorphic on the cut plane, the cut extending along the negative real axis, from 0 (inclusive) to the point at infinity."

Alternatively, Γ(z) might be described as "holomorphic in the cut plane with −π < arg(z) < π and excluding the point z = 0."

This cut is slightly different from the branch cut we've already encountered, because it actually excludes the negative real axis from the cut plane. The branch cut left the real axis connected with the cut plane on one side (0 ≤ θ), but severed it from the cut plane along the other side (θ < 2π).

Of course, it's not actually necessary to exclude the entire line segment from z = 0 to −∞ to construct a domain in which Γ(z) is holomorphic. All we really have to do is puncture the plane at a countably infinite set of points {0, −1, −2, −3, ...}. But a closed contour in the punctured plane might encircle one or more of the poles of Γ(z), giving a contour integral that is not necessarily zero, by the residue theorem. By cutting the complex plane we ensure not only that Γ(z) is holomorphic in this restricted domain – we also ensure that the contour integral of Γ over any closed curve lying in the cut plane is identically equal to zero.

Specifying convergence regions
Many complex functions are defined by infinite series, or by continued fractions. A fundamental consideration in the analysis of these infinitely long expressions is identifying the portion of the complex plane in which they converge to a finite value. A cut in the plane may facilitate this process, as the following examples show.

Consider the function defined by the infinite series

Since z2 = (−z)2 for every complex number z, it's clear that f(z) is an even function of z, so the analysis can be restricted to one half of the complex plane. And since the series is undefined when

it makes sense to cut the plane along the entire imaginary axis and establish the convergence of this series where the real part of z is not zero before undertaking the more arduous task of examining f(z) when z is a pure imaginary number.

In this example the cut is a mere convenience, because the points at which the infinite sum is undefined are isolated, and the cut plane can be replaced with a suitably punctured plane. In some contexts the cut is necessary, and not just convenient. Consider the infinite periodic continued fraction

It can be shown that f(z) converges to a finite value if and only if z is not a negative real number such that . In other words, the convergence region for this continued fraction is the cut plane, where the cut runs along the negative real axis, from − to the point at infinity.

Gluing the cut plane back together

We have already seen how the relationship

can be made into a single-valued function by splitting the domain of f into two disconnected sheets. It is also possible to "glue" those two sheets back together to form a single Riemann surface on which  can be defined as a holomorphic function whose image is the entire w-plane (except for the point ). Here's how that works.

On one sheet define , so that , by definition. On the second sheet define , so that , again by definition. Now flip the second sheet upside down, so the imaginary axis points in the opposite direction of the imaginary axis on the first sheet, with both real axes pointing in the same direction, and "glue" the two sheets together (so that the edge on the first sheet labeled "" is connected to the edge labeled "" on the second sheet, and the edge on the second sheet labeled "" is connected to the edge labeled "" on the first sheet).

When  we are still on the first sheet. In other words, as the variable z makes two complete turns around the branch point, the image of z in the w-plane traces out just one complete circle.

Formal differentiation shows that

from which we can conclude that the derivative of f exists and is finite everywhere on the Riemann surface, except when  (that is, f is holomorphic, except when ).

How can the Riemann surface for the function

also discussed above, be constructed? We flip one of these upside down, so the two imaginary axes point in opposite directions, and glue the corresponding edges of the two cut sheets together. The cut forces us onto the second sheet, so that when z has traced out one full turn around the branch point , w has taken just one-half of a full turn, the sign of w has been reversed (since ), and our path has taken us to the point  on the second sheet of the surface. Continuing on through another half turn we encounter the other side of the cut, where , and finally reach our starting point ( on the first sheet) after making two full turns around the branch point.

The imaginary axes on the two sheets point in opposite directions so that the counterclockwise sense of positive rotation is preserved as a closed contour moves from one sheet to the other (remember, the second sheet is upside down). Imagine this surface embedded in a three-dimensional space, with both sheets parallel to the xy-plane. Then there appears to be a vertical hole in the surface, where the two cuts are joined together. Again a Riemann surface can be constructed, but this time the "hole" is horizontal. Topologically speaking, both versions of this Riemann surface are equivalent – they are orientable two-dimensional surfaces of genus one.

Use in control theory

In control theory, one use of the complex plane is known as the s-plane.  It is used to visualise the roots of the equation describing a system's behaviour (the characteristic equation) graphically.  The equation is normally expressed as a polynomial in the parameter 's' of the Laplace transform, hence the name 's' plane. Points in the s-plane take the form , where 'j' is used instead of the usual 'i to represent the imaginary component.

Another related use of the complex plane is with the Nyquist stability criterion.  This is a geometric principle which allows the stability of a closed-loop feedback system to be determined by inspecting a Nyquist plot of its open-loop magnitude and phase response as a function of frequency (or loop transfer function) in the complex plane.

The z-plane is a discrete-time version of the s-plane, where z-transforms are used instead of the Laplace transformation.

Quadratic spaces
The complex plane is associated with two distinct quadratic spaces. For a point  in the complex plane, the squaring function z2 and the norm-squared  are both quadratic forms. The former is frequently neglected in the wake of the latter's use in setting a metric on the complex plane. These distinct faces of the complex plane as a quadratic space arise in the construction of algebras over a field with the Cayley–Dickson process. That procedure can be applied to any field, and different results occur for the fields R and C: when R is the take-off field, then C is constructed with the quadratic form  but the process can also begin with C and z2, and that case generates algebras that differ from those derived from R'''. In any case, the algebras generated are composition algebras; in this case the complex plane is the point set for two distinct composition algebras.

Other meanings of "complex plane"
The preceding sections of this article deal with the complex plane in terms of a geometric representation of the complex numbers. Although this usage of the term "complex plane" has a long and mathematically rich history, it is by no means the only mathematical concept that can be characterized as "the complex plane". There are at least three additional possibilities.
Two-dimensional complex vector space, a "complex plane" in the sense that it is a two-dimensional vector space whose coordinates are complex numbers''. See also: .
(1 + 1)-dimensional Minkowski space, also known as the split-complex plane, is a "complex plane" in the sense that the algebraic split-complex numbers can be separated into two real components that are easily associated with the point  in the Cartesian plane.
The set of dual numbers over the reals can also be placed into one-to-one correspondence with the points  of the Cartesian plane, and represent another example of a "complex plane".

See also

 Complex coordinate space
 Complex geometry
 Constellation diagram
 Riemann sphere
 s-plane
 In-phase and quadrature components
 Real line

Notes

References

Works Cited 

 Reprinted (1973) by Chelsea Publishing Company .

External links

 
 Jean-Robert Argand, "Essai sur une manière de représenter des quantités imaginaires dans les constructions géométriques", 1806, online and analyzed on BibNum [for English version, click 'à télécharger']

Complex analysis
Complex numbers
Classical control theory